Collegium Musicum was a Slovak art rock / progressive rock band formed by Marián Varga and Fedor Frešo in Czechoslovakia in late 1969, best known for their complex, predominantly instrumental compositions centred around Varga's keyboards/organ, and for their interpretations of classical works by Rimsky-Korsakov, Stravinsky, Bartók, and others. While never achieving mainstream popularity, the band was among the most influential formations on the Czech/Slovak music scene in the 1970s, drawing comparisons to the Emerson, Lake & Palmer, and featured some of the foremost Slovak rock instrumentalists, including Fedor Frešo (bass), František Griglák (guitar), and others. Known for their live performances, Collegium Musicum enjoyed a revival through touring in the late 1990s and early 2000s, particularly among younger generations. The band disbanded after death of group leader Varga in late 2017.

Discography
 1970 Collegium Musicum
 1970 EP Hommage à J.S.Bach/Ulica plná plášťov do dažďa
 1971 Konvergencie
 1973 Live
 1975 Marián Varga & Collegium Musicum
 1978 Continuo
 1979 On a Ona
 1981 Divergencie
 1989 Všetko je inak
 1997 Collegium Musicum '97
 2010 Speak, Memory

Members
 Marián Varga organ (1969–2017)
 Fedor Frešo bass-guitar (1970–1973, 1977–1979, 1992–2017)
 Dušan Hájek drums (1970–1975, 1977–1979, 1997)
 František Griglák guitar (1971–1972, 1997–2017)
 Fedor Letňan guitar (1969)
 Rasťo Vacho guitar (1969,1971)
 Pavel Váně guitar (1970)
 Ivan Belák bass-guitar (1973–1975)
 Jozef Farkaš guitar (1974–1975)
 Peter Szapu drums (1975–1977)
 Andrej Horváth guitar (1975–1977)
 Ľudovít Nosko vocal (1977–1979)
 Peter Peteraj guitar (1979–1981)
 Anastasis Engonidis bass-guitar (1981)
 Cyril Zeleňák drums (1981, 1992,)
 Pavol Kozma drums (1979–1981)
 Karel Witz guitar (1977–1979)
 Martin Valihora drums (2008–??)

See also
 Collegium Musicum - a type of musical society
 The 100 Greatest Slovak Albums of All Time

References

External links
 Official website (in Slovak)
 TV series Slovenský bigbít (in Slovak)

Slovak rock music groups
Musical groups established in 1969
Musical groups disestablished in 2017
1969 establishments in Czechoslovakia
2017 disestablishments in Slovakia